"Give It All U Got" was supposed to be the fourth single from Lil Jon's debut studio album, Crunk Rock. It was released digitally on November 3, 2009 in iTunes The song features Kee (Kinnda) and it was produced by RedOne. The song was left off the album when it was finally released in 2010.

"Give It All U Got", which features Kee on the original version and also features British rapper Tinchy Stryder on the official remix (along with Kee), peaked at 90 on the Canadian Hot 100.

There is also a remix by Laidback Luke.

References

External links 
Lil Jon - Give It All U Got ft. Kee, on YouTube via VEVO. Retrieved 31 March 2011.

Lil Jon songs
Tinchy Stryder songs
Songs written by RedOne
Songs written by Lil Jon
Songs written by Bilal Hajji
Song recordings produced by RedOne
Songs with music by Tinchy Stryder
Songs written by Kinnda